The athlete quota for archery is 128 athletes, 64 men and 64 women. There is a maximum of six athletes per National Olympic Committee, three per gender. NOC's with three athletes of the same gender automatically qualify for the team competition. Athletes can not qualify themselves directly into Beijing. Once they qualify they earn spots for their NOC, which then can decide which of the athletes who have reached the MQS (Minimum Qualification Score) they select. The MQS for FITA rounds are 1200 (men) and 1180 (women). For 70m rounds they are 600 (men) and 590 (women). Athletes who wish to qualify for the Olympics need to achieve the MQS in the period starting from 5 July 2007 until 16 July 2008.

Qualification spots allocated

Qualification timeline

Men

Women

Team Event Qualification

 H: qualified as host nation
 W: qualified after the world championships
 C: qualified after the continental championships

See also
 Archery at the Summer Olympics#Qualification

References

 Olympic Games Qualification Places, Men, Women

Qualification for the 2008 Summer Olympics
Qualification